Alexander Bayley (died 1832) was the owner of the Woodhall (or Wood Hall) estate in Saint Dorothy Parish, Jamaica, and a slave-owner of over 200 people at one time. He was elected to the House of Assembly of Jamaica in 1820.

References 

1832 deaths
Year of birth missing
British slave owners
19th-century British businesspeople
19th-century Jamaican people
Jamaican landowners
Members of the House of Assembly of Jamaica
19th-century landowners